This is a list of 364 genera in the family Aphodiidae, according to sources that recognize this lineage as a family rather than a subfamily. Note that in many classifications, many of the genera listed here are classified as subgenera of the genus Aphodius, and fewer than 300 genera are recognized in total.

Aphodiidae genera

References